"Sounds and Silences" is episode 147 of the American television anthology series The Twilight Zone. It originally aired on April 3, 1964 on CBS.

Opening narration

Plot
Roswell G. Flemington, owner of a model ship company and formerly a serviceman of the United States Navy, grew up in a home where his mother required silence. Thus, as an adult, he makes as much noise as he possibly can, is obsessed with the Navy (a photo of him in his youth shows he had reached the rank of Seaman Apprentice), and behaves thunderously in response to any slight.

After twenty years, his wife has had enough of his obsession with noise and finally walks out on him.  Now alone, he begins to hear every little noise – a drip of water, the margin bell on a typewriter – like an explosion or gunshot. He sees a psychiatrist who helps him understand that conflict with his wife has caused him to relive his resentment against his mother to the point that he internalizes his mother's affliction. He now realizes it is all in his head, all he needs to do is overcome the mental block with "mind over matter", and he does. The only problem is that when his wife returns to pick up her jewelry, he tells her about it and proceeds to "shut her out".  Unfortunately, his solution proves too effective, and Flemington finds that he can hear nothing.  Now desperate to hear anything, Flemington puts a record on, setting the volume at its highest setting.  Although the scene is silent, the insides of his apartment vibrate from the sound of his stereo.  As the episode ends, Flemington opens up the windows to the street below, and begs for noise.

Closing narration

Cast
 John McGiver as Roswell G. Flemington
 Penny Singleton as Mrs. Lydia Flemington
 Billy Benedict as Conklin
 Francis De Sales as Doctor
 Michael Fox as Psychiatrist

Litigation
In 1961, a script titled "The Sound of Silence" was submitted to the producers and rejected. Following the first screening of "Sounds and Silences", the original author successfully sued Rod Serling for plagiarism because of similarities in the plot, and was awarded $3,500 in damages. Since litigation was ongoing at the time of the initial syndication package creation the episode was withheld until 1984 when it first resurfaced on a special holiday presentation.

References

DeVoe, Bill. (2008). Trivia from The Twilight Zone. Albany, GA: Bear Manor Media. 
Grams, Martin. (2008). The Twilight Zone: Unlocking the Door to a Television Classic. Churchville, MD: OTR Publishing.

External links

1964 American television episodes
The Twilight Zone (1959 TV series season 5) episodes
Television episodes written by Rod Serling